John MacBeth or John McBeth may refer to:
 John McBeth (born 1944), New Zealand journalist and author
 John MacBeth (Manitoba politician) (1854–1897), politician in Manitoba, Canada
 John Palmer MacBeth (1921–1991), politician in Ontario, Canada